Fang Jing (June 1971 – 18 November 2015) was an anchorwoman of China Central Television (CCTV).  She hosted several programs including the prime-time military program Defense Watch.  In 2009 she came under suspicion of spying for Taiwan.

Career
Fang Jing started working for CCTV in 1994 after graduating from China's top school for broadcasting and spent four months at Harvard University as a visiting scholar. She hosted a number of shows including the three-day live coverage of the Transfer of sovereignty of Hong Kong and other millennium celebrations.

Accusation of spying
In 2009, Fang was accused of disclosing state secrets to a man from Taiwan and receiving money from him.  She denied the accusation, but no longer hosted CCTV's Defense Watch program after March 1, 2009.

Death
Fang Jing received treatment for cancer in Taiwan, where she died on 18 November 2015, aged 44.

References

CCTV newsreaders and journalists
1971 births
2015 deaths
People from Beijing